In enzymology, a thiocyanate hydrolase is an enzyme that catalyzes the chemical reaction

thiocyanate + 2 H2O  carbonyl sulfide + NH3 + HO-

Thus, the two substrates of this enzyme are thiocyanate and H2O, whereas its 3 products are carbonyl sulfide, NH3, and HO-.

This enzyme belongs to the family of hydrolases, those acting on carbon-nitrogen bonds other than peptide bonds, specifically in nitriles.  The systematic name of this enzyme class is thiocyanate aminohydrolase.

Structural studies

References

 
 

EC 3.5.5
Enzymes of known structure